Tramain is a given name. Notable people with the name include:

Tramain Jacobs (born 1992), American football player
Tramain Jones (born 1975), American football player

See also
Tremain